"Signs" is a song by Swiss singer-songwriter Luca Hänni. It was written by Luca Hänni and Rachel Vermeulen, while production was helmed by Mathias Ramson and Erik Wigelius. The song was released as a digital single on 13 April 2018 by Muve Recordings. It peaked at number 53 on the Swiss Singles Chart.

Music video
A music video to accompany the release of "Signs" was first released onto YouTube on 16 April 2018 at a total length of four minutes and twenty-two seconds.

Track listing

Charts

Release history

References

2018 singles
2018 songs
Luca Hänni songs
Songs written by Luca Hänni